Charaxes acraeoides is a butterfly in the family Nymphalidae first described by Herbert Druce in 1908. It is found in Cameroon, Gabon, the Republic of the Congo, the Central African Republic and the Democratic Republic of the Congo.

Description

It is one of the two Charaxes species with strikingly elongated forewings the outer margin of which are concave. The other is the less falcate Charaxes fournierae. The ground colour is black, the pattern is dull red.

Original description

"Charaxes acraeoides, sp. n.

Male.—Head black, with four yellow spots, two on each side above the eye; antennae black; collar, tegular, thorax, and abdomen black; a white spot on the thorax just behind the collar and two yellow spots on each side of the thorax;palpi above black, the underside orange-yellow; the underside of the thorax and abdomen orange-yellow; the legs black. Primaries [forewings] black, crossed near the apex by a band of four elongated cream-coloured spots, the inner margin streaked with red, above which are five large red spots, the one nearest the anal angle the largest: secondaries [hindwings] red, black at the base and partly along the inner margin, the anal angle and part of the inner margin cream-colour; a black streak at the end of the cell, with the black spots on the underside showing through; the outer margin from the apex to the anal angle black, with a series of minute white dots in the middle of the black margin. Underside: primaries, the apical part of the wing pale yellowish brown, the veins and streaks between
the veins black; the cream-coloured band as above, edged on the inner side by a band of black spots which extend along the outer margin to the anal angle; the cell and the central part of wing greenish grey; the usual black marks in the cell; the wing below the cell to the inner margin orange-red: secondaries orange-red, palest above the cell and above the anal angle; the outer margins and veins all black; four large black spots on the costal margin, four in the cell, and a row of five partly round the outside of the cell; the black outer margin is spotted with blue and greenish-grey dots.

Expanse 4 and 1/2 inches.

Hab. Cameroons, Bitje, Ja River, 2000 feet; wet season (Mus. Druce).
This very fine species reminds one at first sight of Pseudacraea clarki, Butler, which also came in the collection."

Female
The female was not described until 1976

Biology
These are fast-flying butterflies which are part of a mimicry ring with Acraea and Pseudacraea species.

Habitat
The habitat consists of primary forest (Congolian forests).

Realm
Afrotropical realm.

Taxonomy
Charaxes acraeoides group

The supposed clade members are

Charaxes acraeoides
Charaxes fournierae rare
Charaxes jolybouyeri rare

References

Arnold Schultze, 1917 Die charaxiden und apaturiden der kolonie Kamerun: eine zoogeographische und biologische studie / von Arnold Schultze. Mit tafel IX-XIV, 1 karte und 2 textfiguren. Berlin, Gesellschaft Naturforschender Freunde zu Berlin, 1916 
Victor Gurney Logan Van Someren, 1974 Revisional notes on African Charaxes (Lepidoptera: Nymphalidae). Part IX. Bulletin of the British Museum of Natural History (Entomology) 29 (8):415-487. 
Vingerhoedt, Zakharov, Rougerie & Bouyer, 2010 Révision du statut des membres du groupe de Charaxes acraeoides, Druce 1908; approche intégrant morphologie, biogéographie et code barre ADN. Entomologia Africana n°15, volume 1:36 - 48.

External links
Images of C. acraeoides  Royal Museum for Central Africa (Albertine Rift Project)
Charaxes Systematics African Charaxes/Charaxes Africains Eric Vingerhoedt
TOL Tree of Life Alternative clade.
Charaxes acraeoides  images at Consortium for the Barcode of Life
African Butterfly Database Range map via search

Butterflies described in 1908
acraeoides